Washington Park Lake is a body of water in Albany, New York located in the southwestern corner of Washington Park. A wrought-iron pedestrian bridge spans the lake at its narrowest point. The footbridge over Washington Park Lake is the only remaining original structure in Washington Park. Erected over the lake in 1875 the lamps on the bridge were originally gas burning but were electrified in 1881. Ice skating is permitted on Washington Park Lake, though swimming is prohibited.

History
In 1986 after years of the lake being two to three feet below its normal depth the city repaired cracks and leaks in a concrete spillway. After the lake continued to be approximately one foot below normal level, the next year another leak was found where a  beech tree had grown on top of a 19th-century brick sewer pipe that was along the southern shore of the lake. The break in the  sewer pipe created a sinkhole that allowed water from the lake to flow into the sewer. The same pipe caused more problems in 1995 and more repairs occurred.

In 1991 two days after copper sulfate was applied to the lake to kill algae a fish kill occurred due to a lack of oxygen in the water. Hundreds of fish died with many experiencing hypoxic conditions near the surface. The city hooked up a  pipe to two compressors that pumped oxygen into the lake similar to an aerator in an aquarium. This raised oxygen levels quickly and fish returned to their normal behavior.

References

Geography of Albany, New York
Reservoirs in New York (state)
Reservoirs in Albany County, New York